Vencent Cavaselice (1590–1664) was a Roman Catholic prelate who served as Bishop of Carinola (1640–1664).

Biography
Vencent Cavaselice was born in Salerno, Italy in 1590. On 13 August 1640, he was appointed during the papacy of Pope Urban VIII as Bishop of Carinola. On 2 September 1640, he was consecrated bishop by Giulio Cesare Sacchetti, Cardinal-Priest of Santa Susanna, with Pietro Antonio Spinelli, Archbishop of Rossano, and Gaetano Cossa, Archbishop of Otranto, serving as co-consecrators. He served as Bishop of Carinola until his death in 1664.

References

External links and additional sources
 (for Chronology of Bishops) 
 (for Chronology of Bishops) 

17th-century Italian Roman Catholic bishops
Bishops appointed by Pope Urban VIII
1590 births
1664 deaths